2006–07 IRB Sevens World Series was the eighth of an annual series of rugby sevens tournaments for full national sides run by the International Rugby Board since 1999–2000.

New Zealand were the series champions, winning the final tournament in Edinburgh to take the lead on the standings. In that event, the then-defending series champions Fiji would have clinched the season crown by defeating Wales in the Cup quarterfinals. However, a Wales upset win opened the door for New Zealand to take the season crown by winning the Cup in Edinburgh, which they did.

Sevens is traditionally played in a two-day tournament format; however, the most famous event, the Hong Kong Sevens, is played over three days.

Calendar 
Tournaments in Australia and Scotland were added for 2006-07. The Australian event returned after a three season hiatus to effectively replace Singapore. The Scotland event effectively replaced the Paris Sevens.

The season
In a normal event, 16 teams are entered; in Hong Kong, 24 teams enter. In each tournament, the teams are divided into pools of four teams, who play a round-robin within the pool. Points are awarded in each pool on a different schedule from most rugby tournaments—3 for a win, 2 for a draw, 1 for a loss. The first tiebreaker is the head-to-head result between the tied teams, followed by difference in points scored during the tournament.

Four trophies are awarded in each tournament, except for Hong Kong. In descending order of prestige, they are the Cup, whose winner is the overall tournament champion, Plate, Bowl and Shield. In Hong Kong, the Shield is not awarded. Each trophy is awarded at the end of a knockout tournament.

In a normal event, the top two teams in each pool advance to the Cup competition. The four quarterfinal losers drop into the bracket for the Plate. The Bowl is contested by the third-place finishers in each pool, while the Shield is contested by the last-place teams from each pool.

In Hong Kong, the six pool winners, plus the two highest-finishing second-place teams, advance to the Cup. The Plate participants are the eight highest-ranked teams remaining, while the lowest eight drop to the Bowl.

Points schedule
The season championship was determined by the total points earned in all tournaments. The points schedules used for 2006–07 World Sevens Series were tweaked slightly from the previous season at the bottom end of each scale:

Final standings

The points awarded to the teams at each event, as well as their overall series totals, are shown in the table below.

The events

Dubai

South Africa

New Zealand

United States

Hong Kong

Australia

London

Scotland

References

External links

 
World Rugby Sevens Series